Alfio Basile (born 1 November 1943), nicknamed Coco, is an Argentine football manager and former player. He played for Racing Club de Avellaneda and Huracán before becoming a manager. He coached many teams during his career, being most notable Racing Club de Avellaneda (where he won the Supercopa Libertadores, the first international title for the club since 1967), the Argentina national team (with 4 titles won) and Boca Juniors, where he won five titles in two years.

The last team managed by Basile was Racing Club de Avellaneda, which he left in 2012.

Playing career

Born in Bahía Blanca, Basile started his playing career at Club Bella Vista in his home city. From 1964 to 1970 he played for Racing Club, where he played as midfielder until the arrival of coach Juan José Pizutti, who moved him to the defensive line to play as centre-back. In that position, Basile formed a remembered defensive pair with Roberto Perfumo, winning three titles with the club, which reached its peak with the Intercontinental Cup won in 1967 to Celtic FC, the first intercontinental title for an Argentine team.

Basile totalized 186 matches with Racing Club before moving to Huracán, where he was a mainstay of the 1973 Metropolitano champions under coach César Luis Menotti. He also played for the Argentina national team. Basile retired as a player in 1975.

Managerial career
After retirement as a player, Basile coached a number of Argentine teams, most notably Rosario Central, Racing Club, Huracán, Vélez Sársfield, Uruguayan Nacional, and Atlético Madrid.

His career as a coach reached its first peak in the early 1990s, when he led the Argentina national football team to two Copa América, one FIFA Confederations Cup and one CONMEBOL–UEFA Cup of Champions victories. The run-up to the 1994 FIFA World Cup looked smooth until a 5-0 defeat at home to Colombia. Following that traumatic event, Diego Maradona was brought back from retirement to take part in the play-off against Australia.

In the World Cup itself, Argentina opened with two impressive victories over Greece and Nigeria. However, controversy was soon to appear. Maradona was tested for doping after the Nigeria match, and was suspended after ephedrine was found in his sample. Argentina still progressed to the last 16 despite a 2-0 defeat by Bulgaria, but morale was shattered and the team was eliminated after losing to Romania.

After resigning over the World Cup disappointment, Basile went on to coach San Lorenzo de Almagro, Club América of México and Colón de Santa Fe with varying degrees of success. In July 2005 he assumed the post of coach at Boca Juniors, winning the Recopa Sudamericana 2005 just a month later. He then won his first Argentine league title in the 2005 Apertura tournament. Four days later, Boca won the Copa Sudamericana 2005 against UNAM Pumas of Mexico.

In July 2006, he was once again offered the position of Argentina national football team coach and accepted the job taking over from José Pekerman. Before starting his new job, Basile stayed with Boca Juniors until 14 September 2006, when the team won a second consecutive Recopa Sudamericana 2006 with a victory over São Paulo FC of Brazil.

Vocal about his preference for the Italian Serie A and the Spanish La Liga over the English league, he made waves in England when he called for Carlos Tevez and Javier Mascherano to transfer to Italy, claiming the switch would be better for the latter "even if he would have to play in the second division" with Juventus.

On 16 October 2008, amidst the controversy over the historic defeat that Argentina suffered against Chile in the World Cup qualifiers, Basile tendered his resignation. This eventually paved the road to the appointment of Diego Maradona as national team coach.
As a coach, Basile had in total two tenures at the helm of the Argentina national football team, 1991–1994 and 2006–2008.

On 1 July 2009, Basile returned to Boca Juniors after three years, replacing Carlos Ischia. But after a series of bad results, especially the failure to qualify for the Copa Libertadores 2010 and a crushing 3–1 defeat to archrivals River Plate during a summer tournament at Mar del Plata, he resigned on 21 January 2010.

On 26 December 2011, Basile returned to Racing Club for his fourth spell as their coach, taking over from Diego Simeone. One year later, he resigned after a confusing incident in the Estadio Libertadores de América's change room, with Racing forward Teo Gutiérrez being accused of pointing a gun at a teammate.

Since his departure from Racing, Basile has not managed any team, stating he is "retired" from the activity. Basile has occasionally appeared in some interviews and the TV show Buenos Muchachos (Good Guys) where he participated along with fellow Héctor Veira and singer Cacho Castaña.

In 2019, Basile offered to manage Flat Earth FC, a Spanish amateur team based around the idea that the Earth is flat. He said that he agreed with club president Javi Poves's views on the subject.

Honours

Player
Racing Club
 Primera División: 1966
 Copa Libertadores: 1967
 Intercontinental Cup: 1967

Huracán
 Primera División: 1973 Metropolitano

Manager
Racing Club
 Supercopa Sudamericana: 1988

Argentina
 Copa América: 1991, 1993
 FIFA Confederations Cup: 1992
 CONMEBOL–UEFA Cup of Champions: 1993

Boca Juniors
 Primera División: 2005 Apertura, 2006 Clausura
 Copa Sudamericana: 2005
 Recopa Sudamericana: 2005, 2006

References

External links

Terra.com profile

1953 births
Living people
Sportspeople from Bahía Blanca
Argentine people of Italian descent
Argentine footballers
Argentina international footballers
Racing Club de Avellaneda footballers
Club Atlético Huracán footballers
Argentine football managers
Argentine expatriate football managers
Argentina national football team managers
1994 FIFA World Cup managers
1991 Copa América managers
1993 Copa América managers
2007 Copa América managers
1992 King Fahd Cup managers
FIFA Confederations Cup-winning managers
Chacarita Juniors managers
Racing de Córdoba managers
Instituto managers
Rosario Central managers
Racing Club de Avellaneda managers
Club Atlético Huracán managers
Club Nacional de Football managers
Club Atlético Vélez Sarsfield managers
Talleres de Córdoba managers
San Lorenzo de Almagro managers
Club Atlético Colón managers
Boca Juniors managers
Club América managers
Expatriate football managers in Spain
Bella Vista de Bahía Blanca footballers
Association football central defenders
Argentine people of Sicilian descent
Flat Earth proponents